Gilbey's Cottages Halt railway station was one of four halts, Imperial Cottages, Gilbey's Cottages, Dalvey Farm, and Ballifurth Farm, opened on the Speyside route between Elgin and Aviemore on 15 June 1959, on the introduction of  railbuses. Drivers were warned when approaching the halts by white boards stating 'Request Stop 100 Yards Ahead'.

History

Opened by the Scottish Region of British Railways in 1959, it was then closed by the British Railways Board when services on the line were withdrawn in 1965.

The site today

References

 
 
 
 Site of station on navigable O.S. map Site is on section of track between Carron and Knockando

External links
  Railbuses

Disused railway stations in Moray
Railway stations opened by British Rail
Railway stations in Great Britain opened in 1959
Railway stations in Great Britain closed in 1965
Beeching closures in Scotland